The England national beach soccer team represents England in international beach soccer competitions and is controlled by England Beach Soccer — independent of the governing body of football in England, The Football Association.

Coaching staff

Current squad
Caps and goals updated as of 9 August 2018.

Recent results and upcoming fixtures
Matches played within the last 12 months, as well as upcoming fixtures, are displayed.

Competition history
England participated in the first ever Beach Soccer World Cup in 1995, finishing third, but did not participate in any of the competitions between 1995 and 2001. In 2001 England began competing in the EBSL which doubled as a qualifying competition for the following year's World Cup until 2008 but England did not perform well enough during these years to qualify for the finals. In 2008, a separate qualifying competition was introduced, but England have still failed to progress to the World Cup finals.

World Cup

FIFA Beach Soccer World Cup Qualification (UEFA)

Euro Beach Soccer League
Key:

Results:

Euro Beach Soccer Cup

Best performances
Beach Soccer World Cup
Third place (1): 1995
Euro Beach Soccer League 
Single Division era ('98–'01, '07–'08)
Sixth place (of 8), Main Season: 2001
Multi-Division era ('02–'06, 09'–present)
Division A: Fifth place, Main Season: 2003
Division B: Third place, Promotion Final: 2016

References

External links
England Beach Soccer Website
England Team Profile

European national beach soccer teams
beach soccer
1995 establishments in England